Contrary Creek may refer to:

Contrary Creek (Gasconade River), a stream in Missouri
Contrary Creek (Missouri River), a stream in Missouri
Contrary Creek (North Anna River), a stream in Virginia